Gaetano Genovese (1795, Eboli - 1875, Naples) was an Italian architect and designer. He is most notable as the chief royal architect for almost all of the reign of Ferdinand II of the Two Sicilies.

19th-century Italian architects
People from Eboli
Kingdom of the Two Sicilies people
1795 births
1875 deaths